Kendel Hippolyte (born 1952) is a St Lucian poet and playwright.

Biography
Kendel Hippolyte was born in Castries, the capital of St Lucia, and was educated at the University of the West Indies in Jamaica. He worked as a teacher at St Mary's College in Vigie, Castries, and the Sir Arthur Lewis College at the Morne. He is actively involved as a playwright and director with the Lighthouse Theatre Company, of which he was a co-founder.

He has written eight plays. His best known, Drum-maker, uses idiomatic Caribbean language to explore the indigenous local culture in a political context. He has published several collections of verse, characterized by its modernist free style. He is also the editor of the anthologies Confluence: Nine Saint Lucian Poets (1988) and So Much Poetry in We People (1990).

In 2000, he was awarded the St. Lucia Medal of Merit (Gold) for Contribution to the Arts. In 2013 he won the poetry category of the OCM Bocas Prize for Caribbean Literature for his 2012 poetry collection Fault Lines.

He is married to poet Jane King.

Publications
 Island in the Sun, Side Two… , 1980
 Bearings 1986
 The Labyrinth 1991
 Birthright, 1997
 Night Vision, TriQuarterly Books, Northwestern University Press, 2005
 Fault Lines, Peepal Tree Press, 2012

References

1952 births
20th-century dramatists and playwrights
21st-century dramatists and playwrights
Living people
People from Castries Quarter
Saint Lucian dramatists and playwrights
21st-century Saint Lucian poets
21st-century male writers
University of the West Indies alumni
Saint Lucian male poets
20th-century male writers